Geoffrey Michael Chater Robinson (23 March 1921 – 16 October 2021) was an English film, television and stage actor. He appeared in the crime drama series Callan, Foyle's War and Midsomer Murders.

Biography
 
Geoffrey Michael Chater Robinson was born in Barnet, Hertfordshire on 23 March 1921 and lived in Iden, East Sussex and London. His father, Lawrence Chater Robinson, was a composer of music for dance bands and his mother Peggy was an actress. It was seeing her perform at London St Martin's Theatre when he was 11 that made him want to follow her onto the stage.

Chater was educated at Marlborough College, and joined the Royal Fusiliers in 1940. He served as a captain in India and Burma, where he wrote and performed in revues for the troops during time off. He served in the British Army from 1940–1946.

After the Second World War, he focused on his career in the entertainment industry. He became an assistant stage manager at the Theatre Royal, Windsor, where in 1947, made his first professional appearance in A Midsummer Night’s Dream. His West End debut was in 1952, as "Constable" in Master Crook. Later on he appeared in Howard Brenton's play Magnificence. He also had a minor role in a British TV serial Brideshead Revisited where he played a role of British Consul. He made his film debut in 1958 with The Strange World of Planet X. In Gandhi, he played the chairman of the enquiry into the Amritsar massacre. He also appeared in the film classics If.... (1968) and Barry Lyndon (1975) in supporting roles.

His career saw him take on roles from Shakespeare to Midsomer Murders. While he appeared in films and television roles, he avoided longer contracts so he could have time to devote to his first love of performing in the Theatre.

In 2017, Chater began giving poetry readings and he continued to read the lesson at his local church until lockdown was imposed as a response to the COVID-19 pandemic on 23 March 2020, his 99th birthday.

He turned 100 on 23 March 2021 and died on 16 October 2021 in Iden, East Sussex.

Filmography

Film
 The Strange World of Planet X (1958) - Gerard Wilson
 Battle of the V-1 (1958) - Minister of Defence
 Wonderful Things! (1958) - Solicitor
 The Day the Earth Caught Fire (1961) - Pat Holroyd 
 Two Letter Alibi (1962) - Inspector Warren
 If.... (1968) - Chaplain: Staff
 One of Those Things (1971) - Falck
 10 Rillington Place (1971) - Old Bailey: Christmas Humphreys
 Endless Night (1972) - Coroner
 The Best Pair of Legs in the Business (1973) - Reverend Thorn
 O Lucky Man! (1973) - Bishop / Vicar
 Barry Lyndon (1975) - Doctor Broughton
 Gandhi (1982) - Government Advocate
 Bethune: The Making of a Hero (1990) - Doctor Archibald

Television

 Sherlock Holmes (1951) - Unknown
 Jan at the Blue Fox (1952) -  Mr. Trevor
 The Birdcage Room (1954, TV film) - Mr. Blackfoot
 ITV Television Playhouse (1955) - Dusty
 ITV Play of the Week (1955-1963) - Various roles
 My Friend Charles (1956) - Doctor George Kimber
 Motive for Murder (1957) - Harry Manners
 Armchair Theatre (1958-1971) - Various roles
 The Third Man (1959) - Lord Farset
 Scotland Yard (1960) - Detective Superintendent Lawrie
 Saturday Playhouse (1960) - Raymond
 On Trial (1960) - A.J. Newton
 Walk a Crooked Mile (1961) - Arnold Hedges
 Storyboard (1961) - Duroc
 Family Solicitor (1961) - Mr. Tyler
 Echo Four Two (1961) -  Acting Superintendent Dean
 Probation Officer (1961) - Sir Giles Enton
 Drama 61-67 (1962-1963) - Various roles
 No Hiding Place (1962-1965) - Various roles
 Crying Down the Lane (1962) - Superintendent Lambe
 Z Cars (1963) - Robson
 The Plane Makers (1963) - Simon Stride
 Ghost Squad (1963-1964) - Various roles
 BBC Sunday-Night Play (1963) - The Captain
 The Human Jungle (1963) - Householder
 The Scales of Justice (1963) - Mr. Soames
 Detective (1964)  - Tony Garnish
 Espionage  ('Snow on Mount Kama', episode)  (1964) - Colonel Gregory
 Festival (1964) - Kindred
 Story Parade (1964) - Prosecutor
 The Indian Tales of Rudyard Kipling (1964) - Major Vansuythen
 Victoria Regina (1964) - Doctor Clark
 Theatre 625 (1965-1967) - Various roles
 Front Page Story (1965) -  Bosley Morton
 Emergency-Ward 10 (1965) - Commander Boyle RN
 The Troubleshooters (1966-1967) - Charles du Cros
 Vendetta (1966) - Don Gino
 Adam Adamant Lives! (1967) - Commissioner Hobson
 The Wednesday Play (1967) - Richard Browning
 Softly, Softly (1967) - Framley
 Sexton Blake (1967) -  William Passer
 The Avengers (1967-1968) - Jarvis/Seaton
 City '68 (1967-1968) - Wainwright
 ITV Playhouse (1967-1980) - Various roles
 The Champions (1968) - Forster
 The Saint (1968) - Carl Howard
 The Expert (1968-1969) - Tom Caldicott
 The Power Game (1969) - Arthur Stilton
 ITV Sunday Night Theatre (1969) - Toby Pears
 Department S (1969) - Peck
 Rogues' Gallery (1969) -  Sir Richard Manningham
 W. Somerset Maugham (1969) - Mr. Grey
 The Main Chance (1969-1975) -  Roger Chapman
 Big Brother (1970) - Sir Michael Clarke
 Callan (1970-1972) - Bishop
 Steptoe and Son (1970) - Peregrine
 Biography (1970) - Hoppner
 Fraud Squad (1970) - Brigadier Wildblood
 Doomwatch (1971) - Mullery
 Paul Temple (1971) - Sir Harold Malyon
 Justice (1971) - Lord Rush
 Jason King (1971) - Mr. Horner
 Dad's Army (1972) - Colonel Pierce
 The Dick Emery Show (1972-1975) - Various roles
 Ooh La La! (1973) - Landernau
 Orson Welles' Great Mysteries (1973) - Donald Cosgrove
 Some Mothers Do 'Ave 'Em (1973) - Bank manager
 Thriller (1973-1975) - Various roles
 Special Branch (1974) - Sir Gerald Pastor
 Fall of Eagles (1974) - Charles
 General Hospital (1974) - Mr. Hillier
 Shoulder to Shoulder (1974) - Holloway Prison Governor
 Father Brown (1974) -  Leonard Smythe
 Moll Flanders (1975)  - George Mace 
 Thriller (1975) Episode: "The Next Voice You See" - Sir Peter Hastings
 Jackanory Playhouse (1975) - Chancellor
 Village Hall (1975) -  Leonard Beamish
 The Poisoning of Charles Bravo (1975) -  Mr. Gorst
 Hogg's Back (1975) - Inspector
 Crown Court (1976) - Professor Stuart Adams
 Hadleigh (1976) - David Ringham
 The Howerd Confessions (1976) - Mr. Parsley
 Within These Walls (1976) - Judge Lionel Hunt
 Romance (1977) - Sir Charles Verdayne
 Devenish (1977) - Admiral Sir Percival Wallow
 The Upchat Line (1977) - Mr. Peabody
 The Cedar Tree (1978) - Walter Henderson
 Strangers (1979) - Barker
 Rings on Their Fingers (1979) - Mr. Lowther
 Penmarric (1979) - Doctor Ormott
 Prince Regent (1979)  - Henry Addington
 Play for Today (1979-1981) - Various roles
 Premiere (1980) - Superintendent
 Agony (1981) - Mr. Lucas
 Bognor (1981) - Sir Erris Beg
 The Good Soldier (1981)  - Bagshawe
 Winston Churchill: The Wilderness Years (1981) -  Lord Hailsham
 Brideshead Revisited (1981) - Consul
 Othello (1981) - Brabantio
 Troilus & Cressida (1981) - Nestor
 Shelley (1982) - Mr. Fairbass
 The Agatha Christie Hour (1982) - Canon Parfitt
 Harry's Game (1982) - Colonel George Frost
 The Further Adventures of Lucky Jim (1982) - Magistrate
 Tales of the Unexpected (1982) -  James Hamilton
 Nanny (1983) - Major Fancombe
 The Cleopatras (1983) -  Perigenes
 A Married Man (1983) - Sir Peter Craxton
 The Aerodrome (1983) - Dr. Faulkner
 Shackleton (1983) - Sir Clements Markham
 Foxy Lady (1984) - Mr. Molyneux
 Strangers and Brothers (1984) - Thomas Bevill
 Blott on the Landscape (1985) - Minister
 Mapp and Lucia (1985-1986) - Mr. Algernon Wyse
 Screen Two (1985-1987) - Various roles
 Indiscreet (1988) - Finley
 A Taste for Death (1988) - Frank Musgrave
 The Dog It Was That Died (1989) - Wren
 Anything More Would Be Greedy (1989) - Sir William Crome
 Chelworth (1989) - Rafe Holingsworth
 Norbert Smith, a Life (1989) - Cyril Freebody
 Saracen (1989) - Alan Ross
 The New Statesman (1990) - Justice Saunders
 Harry Enfield's Television Programme (1990) - Mr. Dickinson
 Spymaker: The Secret Life of Ian Fleming 1990) - Lawyer
 Bergerac (1990) - Sir Matthew Osterson
 Brass (1990) -  Air Vice Marshal Plunkett-Downe
 One Foot in the Grave (1990) -  Reverend Croker
 Rumpole of the Bailey (1991) - Gregory Fabian
 Harry Enfield and Chums (1994) - Headmaster
 The House of Eliott (1994) - Wilkinson
 The Rector's Wife (1994) - The Bishop
 Pie in the Sky (1994) -  Doctor Lonsdale
 The Detectives (1995) - Sutton Frobisher
 The Thin Blue Line (1995) - Carol Singer
 The Bill (1998) - Edward Robbins
 In the Red (1998) - Mr Justice Frimlington
 Heartbeat   (1999) Hal Clifford 
 Heartbeat (2003) - Sir Henry Bing
 Foyle's War (2003) - Professor Phillips
 Midsomer Murders (2005) - Brother Robert

References

External links

1921 births
2021 deaths
English centenarians
English male film actors
English male television actors
Male actors from Hertfordshire
Men centenarians
People from Chipping Barnet
English male stage actors
20th-century English male actors
21st-century English male actors